William Henry Lamb (5 January 1889 – 8 January 1964) was an Australian politician. He was a member of the New South Wales Legislative Assembly from 1938 until 1962 and a member of the NSW Branch of the Labor Party and the Lang Labor Party. He was the Speaker of the New South Wales Legislative Assembly between 1947 and 1959.

Early life
Lamb was born in Nyngan, New South Wales. The son of a coachbuilder, Lamb was educated to elementary level at state schools—including one at the oil shale mining village of Airly—and from the age of 12 he worked as a grocer's boy and then as a coalminer. At age 19 he became a teacher in NSW rural schools and studied accountancy in his spare time. He was an office manager after 1927. A protégé of Jack Lang, Lamb was an alderman on Auburn Municipal Council from 1932 and was the mayor in 1935. As mayor in 1935, he was awarded the King George V Silver Jubilee Medal. In October 1939, having moved from Auburn to Granville, Lamb resigned as an alderman.

Political career
At the 1938 state election, Lamb was elected to the New South Wales Parliament as the Labor member for the new seat of Granville. He defeated the sitting United Australia Party member, Claude Fleck. He was a supporter of Lang's Australian Labor Party (Non-Communist) during the party split of 1941 but did not support the later manifestations of Lang Labor.

Speaker of the Legislative Assembly
Lamb succeeded Daniel Clyne as the Speaker of the New South Wales Legislative Assembly after the 1947 election and retained the position for twelve years. His time as speaker was characterised by his singular interpretation of standing orders and firm control, leading to frequent criticism from the opposition for inflexibility, unnecessary interjections from the chair and bias towards the government. Unusually for a serving speaker, Lamb often made contributions in committee stages of bills. Controversially he even opposed some of his government's legislation, including the Local Government (Areas) bill in 1948, calling it a "flagrant violation of the fundamental principles of the democratic system" which was a reference to the decision to amalgamate Granville Council into Parramatta instead of the other way round.

Defeated in a caucus ballot for speaker in 1959, Lamb was granted retention of the "Honourable" title. Lamb retained his seat of Granville throughout his time in parliament but lost Labor Party pre-selection prior to the 1962 state election and retired. He did not live long outside of politics, dying on 8 January 1964, and was buried in Rookwood Cemetery.

References

 

1889 births
1964 deaths
Members of the New South Wales Legislative Assembly
Speakers of the New South Wales Legislative Assembly
People from the Central West (New South Wales)
Australian Labor Party members of the Parliament of New South Wales
20th-century Australian politicians
Australian schoolteachers
Australian accountants
Burials at Rookwood Cemetery
Mayors of Auburn